This list of Russian physicians and psychologists includes the famous physicians and psychologists, medical scientists and medical doctors from the Russian Federation, the Soviet Union, the Russian Empire and other predecessor states of Russia. Physicians of all specialties may be listed here.

Alphabetical list



A
Nikolai Amosov, prominent cardiovascular surgery developer, best-selling author

B
Aleksandr Bakulev, prominent cardiovascular surgery developer 
Vladimir Bekhterev, neuropathologist, founder of objective psychology, noted the role of the hippocampus in memory, major contributor to reflexology, studied the Bekhterev’s Disease
Vladimir Betz, discovered Betz cells of primary motor cortex
Peter Borovsky, described the causative agent of Oriental sore
Sergey Botkin, major therapist and court physician
Nikolay Burdenko, major developer of neurosurgery
Konstantin Buteyko, developed the Buteyko method for the treatment of asthma and other breathing disorders

C
Mikhail Chumakov, co-discovered tick-borne encephalitis, co-developed oral polio vaccine

D
Livery Darkshevich, neurologist, described the nucleus of posterior commissure
Vladimir Demikhov, major pioneer of transplantology

F
Vladimir Filatov, ophthalmologist, corneal transplantation pioneer
Svyatoslav Fyodorov, inventor of radial keratotomy

G
Pyotr Gannushkin, psychiatrist, pioneer researcher of psychopathies known today as personality disorders
Oleg Gazenko, founder of space medicine, selected and trained Laika, the first space dog
Georgy Gause, inventor of gramicidin S and other antibiotics
Vera Gedroitz, world's first female professor of surgery
Hans-Werner Gessmann, one of the world's most famous professor of clinical psychology, founder of humanistic psychodrama psychotherapy
Yuliya Gippenreyter, researcher in experimental psychology, family therapy and neuro-linguistic programming
Ilya Gruzinov, found that vocal folds are the source of phonation

H
Waldemar Haffkine, invented the first vaccines against cholera and bubonic plague

I
Gavriil Ilizarov, invented Ilizarov apparatus, developed distraction osteogenesis

K
Nikolai Korotkov, invented auscultatory blood pressure measurement, pioneer of vascular surgery
Sergey Korsakov, studied the effects of alcoholism on the nervous system, described Korsakoff's syndrome, introduced paranoia concept
Aleksei Kozhevnikov, neurologist and psychiatrist, described the epilepsia partialis continua

L
Aleksey Leontyev, founder of activity theory in psychology
Peter Lesgaft, founder of the modern system of physical education in Russia
Andrey Yevgenyevich Lichko, adolescent psychiatrist
Alexander Luria, co-developer of activity theory and cultural-historical psychology, major researcher of aphasia

M
Ilya Mechnikov, pioneer researcher of immune system, probiotics and phagocytosis; coined the term "gerontology", Nobel Prize in Medicine winner
Lazar Minor, neurologist, described Minor's disease

N
Pyotr Nikolsky, dermatologist, discoverer of Nikolsky's sign
Raissa Nitabuch, pathologist, the first to describe the spiral arteries which connect the uterine and placental blood flow during pregnancy.

O
Alexey Olovnikov, predicted existence of telomerase, suggested the telomere hypothesis of aging and the telomere relations to cancer

P
Ivan Pavlov, founder of modern physiology, the first to research classical conditioning, influenced comparative psychology and behaviorism by his works on reflexes, Nobel Prize in Medicine winner
Nikolay Pirogov, pioneer of ether anaesthesia and modern field surgery, the first to perform anaesthesia in the field conditions, invented a number of surgical operations
Viktor Protopopov, founder of his own pathophysiological school of thought, namesake of Protopopov's syndrome

R
Leonid Rogozov, performed an appendectomy on himself during the 6th Soviet Antarctic Expedition, a famous case of self-surgery
Grigory Rossolimo, pioneer of child neuropsychology
Vladimir Roth, neuropathologist, described meralgia paraesthetica

S

Ivan Sechenov, founder of electrophysiology and neurophysiology, author of the classic work Reflexes of the Brain
Vladimir Serbsky, founder of forensic psychiatry in Russia
Nikolay Sklifosovskiy, prominent 19th-century field surgeon
Victor Skumin, first to describe a previously unknown disease, now called Skumin syndrome (a disorder of the central nervous system of some patients after a prosthetic heart valve)
Lina Stern, pioneer researcher of blood–brain barrier

U
Fyodor Uglov, oldest practicing surgeon in history
 Igor Ursov, phthisiatrist, the inventor of intravenous intermittent bactericidal tuberculosis therapy

V
Alexander Varshavsky, researched ubiquitination, Wolf Prize in Medicine winner
Vikenty Veresayev, Russian/Soviet doctor, author of Memoirs of a Physician
Luka Voyno-Yasenetsky, founder of purulent surgery, saint
Lev Vygotsky, founder of cultural-historical psychology, major contributor to child development and psycholinguistics, introduced zone of proximal development and cultural mediation concepts

W
Josias Weitbrecht, first to describe the construction and function of intervertebral discs

Y
Sergei Yudin, inventor of cadaveric blood transfusion

Z
 Alexander Zaporozhets, developmental psychologist, collaborator of Vygotsky, Luria, and Leontiev, once head of the Kharkov School of Psychology
Bluma Zeigarnik, psychiatrist, discovered the Zeigarnik effect, founded experimental psychopathology

See also
List of physicians
Psychiatry in the Soviet Union
List of Russian scientists
List of Russian inventors
Science and technology in Russia

References

 
 
Physicians and psychologists
Russians
Russian psychologists, list of
Physicians and psychologists